Marin Pongračić (born 11 September 1997) is a Croatian footballer who plays as a defender for Italian  club Lecce, on loan from  VfL Wolfsburg. He also represents the Croatia national team.  Pongračić is principally a centre-back but can also play at right-back or as a defensive midfielder.

Club career

1860 Munich
Pongračić started his football career as a product of Bayern Munich academy, before moving to Ingolstadt in 2013 at the age of 16. He made 38 appearances at under-17 and under-19 levels, before moving to 1860 Munich in 2016 in search of professional football. After establishing himself in the reserve team, he made his 2. Bundesliga debut on 16 April 2017 in a 1–1 draw with Sandhausen. He made seven appearances for the first team, including an appearance in a relegation play-off against Jahn Regensburg. Pongračić was sent off in the 80th minute, as the match ended up as a 1–1 draw.

Red Bull Salzburg
In summer 2017, he joined Austrian club Red Bull Salzburg on a four year deal. He made his debut for the club on 22 July in a 2–0 victory over Wolfsberger AC. However, due to an abductor muscle injury, he missed thirteen games for the club. He returned to the team for the 5 November game against St. Pölten. He made his UEFA Europa League debut on 23 November in a 3–0 victory over Vitória Guimarães. He then featured throughout Salzburg's Europa League campaign as they reached the semi-final, where they were eliminated by Marseille. Salzburg ended the season as the Austrian champions.

On 29 August 2018, in a Champions League play-off against Red Star Belgrade, Pongračić fouled Milan Pavkov and received a yellow card. The game ended as a 2–2 draw and Red Star qualified on away goals. Red Star captain Vujadin Savić later credited Pongračić's foul as the reason for his club's triumph, calling Pongračić out for "provocations during the whole match." On 21 February 2019, he provided Patson Daka with an assist for the second goal as Salzburg defeated Club Brugge 4–0 in Europa League round of 32. In his second season at the club, Pongračić helped Salzburg win the double.

During the first half of the 2019–20 season, he made only seven appearances for the club due to injuries. On 5 November, he made his Champions League debut in a 1–1 draw with Napoli.

VfL Wolfsburg
After the injury-stricken stint at Salzburg, Pongračić joined VfL Wolfsburg on 15 January 2020 on a four-and-a-half year deal for a fee believed to be €10 million. On 8 February, in his second appearance for the club, he was sent off after elbowing Alfredo Morales, as Wolfsburg drew 1–1 with Fortuna Düsseldorf. On 26 May, Pongračić scored twice as Wolfsburg defeated Bayer Leverkusen by a score of 4–1.

After he missed the beginning of the new season due to mononucleosis, Pongračić returned to the team on 8 November as an injury time substitute for Xaver Schlager in the 2–1 victory over 1899 Hoffenheim. However, on 18 November, he tested positive for COVID-19. On 27 February 2021, he was sent off in the injury time of a 2–0 victory over Hertha Berlin.

Borussia Dortmund (loan)
On 31 August 2021, Pongračić joined Borussia Dortmund on loan for the duration of the 2021–22 season. He made his Dortmund debut on 11 September in a 4–3 victory over Bayer Leverkusen.

Lecce (loan)
On 22 August 2022, Pongračić moved on loan to Lecce in Italy, with an option to buy.

International career
Eligible to represent Germany and Croatia, Pongračić was called up to a training camp for the Croatia U17s in 2014. He was capped three times on under-21 level, against Moldova, Austria and France. He was dropped from Croatia's squad for UEFA Under-21 Euro 2019 due to injuries.

He received his first call-up for the senior team on 17 August 2020 for September Nations League fixtures against Portugal and France. However, ten days later, he withdrew from the squad due to mononucleosis and was replaced by Mile Škorić. He was called up once again on 4 November for same-month fixtures against Turkey, Sweden and Portugal. He made his debut on 11 November in a friendly 3–3 draw with Turkey, having been named in the starting lineup.

On 17 May 2021, Pongračić was named in the preliminary 34-man squad for the UEFA Euro 2020, but did not make the final 26. On 31 October 2022, he was named in the preliminary 34-man squad for the 2022 FIFA World Cup, but did not make the final 26 again.

Personal life 
Pongračić was born in Landshut, Germany. His parents Stribor and Anđelka fled from Slavonski Brod, Croatia to Germany during the Croatian War of Independence.

Pongračić named Kalidou Koulibaly and Virgil van Dijk his football idols. He is also a fan of Dinamo Zagreb.

Career statistics

Club

International

Honours
Red Bull Salzburg
Austrian Bundesliga: 2017–18, 2018–19
Austrian Cup: 2018–19

References

External links
 

1997 births
Living people
Footballers from Bavaria
Sportspeople from Landshut
German people of Croatian descent
Citizens of Croatia through descent
Association football central defenders
German footballers
Croatian footballers
Croatia under-21 international footballers
Croatia international footballers
TSV 1860 Munich II players
TSV 1860 Munich players
FC Red Bull Salzburg players
VfL Wolfsburg players
Borussia Dortmund players
U.S. Lecce players
Regionalliga players
2. Bundesliga players
Austrian Football Bundesliga players
Bundesliga players
Serie A players
Croatian expatriate footballers
Croatian expatriate sportspeople in Germany
Expatriate footballers in Germany
Croatian expatriate sportspeople in Austria
Expatriate footballers in Austria
Croatian expatriate sportspeople in Italy
Expatriate footballers in Italy